Ricky's may refer to:

Ricky's All Day Grill, a restaurant chain in Canada
Ricky's Sports Theatre and Grill, a sports bar in San Leandro, California